The 2006 Finlandia Trophy is an annual senior-level international figure skating competition held in Finland. It was held in Vantaa on October 6–8, 2006. Skaters competed in the disciplines of men's singles and ladies' singles.

Results

Men

Ladies

External links
 2006 Finlandia Trophy results

Finlandia Trophy
Finlandia Trophy, 2006
Finlandia Trophy, 2006